The British Society of Oral Implantology (BSOI) is dedicated to the advancement of education and training in implant dentistry.

Its headquarters are in Southport, Metropolitan Borough of Sefton, Merseyside, North West England.

References

External links 

 BSOI- British Society of Oral Implantology

Dental organisations based in the United Kingdom
Organizations with year of establishment missing
Medical and health organisations based in Merseyside
Metropolitan Borough of Sefton